Francesco I Crispo, Patrizio Veneto (died 1397) was the tenth Duke of the Archipelago through his marriage and the will of Venice.

Francesco Crispo was probably born in Verona. He was Lord of Milos, thus a vassal to the Duke of Naxos, as well as his cousin through his marriage to Fiorenza Sanudo, a grand-daughter of the Duke Guglielmo Sanudo. Crispo might also have been a pirate. He was sent by the Republic of Venice to Naxos in March 1383 for concern that the then Duke Niccolò III dalle Carceri was incompetent. The Republic suffered from predation by the Ottoman Empire in the Aegean.

On the island, a hunt was suggested. Officially, on the way back Niccolo III, escorted by Crispo's men was attacked by rebels or thieves. He fell off his horse and died. To quench any revolt, Francesco Crispo had to assume power.

The Republic of Venice quickly sent its congratulations.

Andros was another problem. It belonged to Maria Sanudo, sister of the late duke. When Francesco gave as a dowry Andros and Syros to his own daughter Pétronilla, Maria Sanudo called for justice in Venice.

With his wife he had eight children:
 Giacomo I Crispo
 Petronilla Crispo (1384–1427), married to Pietro Zeno, together they received Andros and Syros as dowry
 Agnese Crispo (1386–1428), married to Dragonetto Clavelli, Lord of Nisyros
 John II Crispo
 William II Crispo
 Nicholas Crispo, Lord of Syros
 Marco I Crispo, Lord of Ios
 Nobil Huomo Pietro Crispo, Patrizio Veneto (1397–1440), married to NN and had issue:
 Giovanni Crispo (died 1475), Knight of the Knights Hospitaller

References

Bibliography
  Frazee, Charles A. (1988). The Island Princes of Greece: The Dukes of the Archipelago. Amsterdam: Adolf M. Hakkert. 
  Hetherington, Paul (2001). The Greek Islands: Guide to the Byzantine and Medieval Buildings and their Art. London: Quiller. 
  Slot, B. (1982). Archipelagus turbatus: Les Cyclades entre colonisation latine et occupation ottomane. c.1500-1718. [Istanbul]: L'Institut historique-archéologique Néerlandais de Stamboul.

External links
 

1397 deaths
Francesco 01
Francesco 01
Year of birth unknown
14th-century monarchs in Europe
14th-century Venetian people